Attorney General Robertson may refer to:

Jim Robertson (politician) (born 1945), Attorney-General of the Northern Territory
John Robertson (congressman) (1787–1873), Attorney General of Virginia
Thomas B. Robertson (1779–1828), Attorney General of the Orleans Territory and Attorney General of Louisiana

See also
General Robertson (disambiguation)